Koboldo is a rural locality (a selo) in Koboldinsky Selsoviet of Selemdzhinsky District, Amur Oblast, Russia. The population was 378 as of 2018. There are 15 streets.

Geography 
Koboldo is located on the right bank of the Selemdzha River, 41 km southwest of Ekimchan (the district's administrative centre) by road.

References 

Rural localities in Selemdzhinsky District